S.E.M. Group is a group of related civil engineering companies based in South Australia. It was established in 1976 by Harry and Janice Wauer as Salisbury Earthmovers Pty. Ltd.

S.E.M. Group is responsible for the interface of Bolivar Road and Port Wakefield Road as part of the Northern Connector project.

References

Construction and civil engineering companies of Australia
Companies based in South Australia
Australian companies established in 1976
Construction and civil engineering companies established in 1976